Julian Mertens (born 6 October 1997) is a Belgian professional racing cyclist, who currently rides for UCI ProTeam . In September 2020, he rode in the 2020 La Flèche Wallonne race in Belgium.

Major results
2016
 1st Stage 3 Keizer der Juniores
 6th La Philippe Gilbert Juniors
 9th Overall Aubel–Thimister–La Gleize
2017
 8th Flèche Ardennaise
2018
 3rd Overall Ronde de l'Isard
 6th Grand Prix de la Ville de Lillers
 7th Liège–Bastogne–Liège U23
 8th Eschborn–Frankfurt Under–23
 9th Flèche Ardennaise
 10th Overall Circuit des Ardennes
2019
 3rd Lillehammer GP
 4th Flèche Ardennaise
 6th Paris–Troyes
 7th Liège–Bastogne–Liège U23
 8th Grand Prix des Marbriers
 10th Overall Tour de Bretagne

References

External links
 

1997 births
Living people
Belgian male cyclists
Sportspeople from Turnhout
Cyclists from Antwerp Province